Douglas Leonard Stevenson (April 6, 1924 – November 9, 1975) was a Canadian professional ice hockey goaltender who played eight games in the National Hockey League: four with the New York Rangers and four with the Chicago Black Hawks. He spent the majority of his career with the Tacoma Rockets of the Pacific Coast Hockey League (later Western Hockey League).

Unusually, upon Stevenson's NHL debut with the Rangers -- with a heavily depleted roster due to World War II, and with the Rangers' starting goaltender Ken McAuley unable to play because of a knee injury -- on February 12, 1945, against the Montreal Canadiens, he had played earlier in the day for the New York Rovers of the Eastern Amateur Hockey League against the Washington Lions, giving up four goals in a 4-4 tie.  Stevenson made 36 saves in a 4-3 loss to the Canadiens.

External links

1924 births
1975 deaths
Canadian ice hockey goaltenders
Chicago Blackhawks players
Sportspeople from Regina, Saskatchewan
New York Rangers players
New York Rovers players
Ice hockey people from Saskatchewan
Canadian expatriate ice hockey players in the United States